The pale-faced miner bee (Andrena pallidifovea) is a species of miner bee in the family Andrenidae. Another common name for this species is the pale-fovea andrena. It is found in Central America and North America.

References

Further reading

 
 

pallidifovea
Articles created by Qbugbot
Insects described in 1904